Hot Tamale Brass Band is a brass band that plays traditional New Orleans jazz, dixieland, jazz funeral and funky second line music. The band is based in the Boston area. The band has nine full-time members, sometimes performing as small as a quintet, other times performing with as many as 42 members for a Disney  special event.

History
The Hot Tamale Brass Band was formed in 1992 after their leader, Mickey Bones, moved from New Orleans to Boston. The band took up Sunday residency for the next three years at The Plough and Stars in Cambridge, Massachusetts to build a local fan base and develop new material.

Performances
The Hot Tamale Brass Band have performed in many venues such as: the Krewe of Bacchus Mardi Gras parade in New Orleans, the Museum of Fine Arts, Boston, the Cambridge River Festival, the Somerville Theater, First Night Boston, the Berklee Performance Center. and they participated in a well received "party crash" of the radical HONK! festival parade in 2008. They are probably best known for performing over 800 concerts for the Boston Red Sox at Fenway Park for every home game since the year 2000. The band is occasionally asked to dress up in black suit and tie to perform at a New Orleans style jazz funeral. The band needs no amplification so, the mobility of the group has allowed them to perform while being propelled by scullers up the Charles River or on the back of a fire truck in downtown Boston playing dixieland music.

The band has made appearances on Sesame Street, Nickelodeon, the 2005 remake of Fever Pitch by the Farrelly brothers  and have been recently filmed for Ken Burns' Baseball-10th Inning documentary.

Discography
Live at the Shrunken Head (1999)
Live at the Screaming Torso (2009)
Live at the Ballpark (2010)

References
All About Jazz: Interview by music critic Brett Milano in the Boston Phoenix
Fever Pitch movie credits
Hot Tamale Brass Band plays for Disney
Hot Tamale Brass Band at the Boston Museum of Fine Arts

External links
 Official Website
CD Baby
 Hot Tamale Brass Band myspace page

Dixieland ensembles
Musical groups from New Orleans
American brass bands